Miles Wedderburn Lampson, 1st Baron Killearn,  (24 August 1880 – 18 September 1964) was a British diplomat.

Background and education 

Miles Lampson was the son of Norman Lampson, and grandson of Sir Curtis Lampson, 1st Baronet.  His mother was Helen, daughter of Peter Blackburn, MP for Stirlingshire. 
He was educated at Eton.

Diplomatic career 

Lampson entered the Foreign Office in 1903.  He served as Secretary to Garter Mission, Japan, in 1906, as 2nd Secretary at Tokyo, Japan, between 1908 and 1910, as 2nd Secretary at Sofia, Bulgaria in 1911, as 1st Secretary at Peking in 1916, as Acting British High Commissioner in Siberia in 1920 and as British Minister to China between 1926 and 1933.

In 1934 he was appointed High Commissioner for Egypt and the Sudan.  As a result of the Anglo-Egyptian Treaty in December 1936, to which Lampson was a signatory, Britain loosened its grip on Egypt and the post title was changed to Ambassador to Egypt and High Commissioner for the Sudan in 1936.  Lampson continued in this office until 1946.  As ambassador to Egypt he forced King Farouk I to change the cabinet to a Wafdist one through surrounding the king's palace with tanks.

He was then Special Commissioner in Southeast Asia between 1946 and 1948.  He was admitted to the Privy Council in 1941 and raised to the peerage as Baron Killearn, of Killearn in the County of Stirling, on 17 May 1943. He was also awarded the Order of the Rising Sun, Gold Rays with Neck Ribbon of Japan and the Order of the Sacred Treasure, Gold Rays with Neck Ribbon of Japan.

Family 

Lord Killearn married firstly Rachel, daughter of William Wilton Phipps, in 1912. They had one son and two daughters:
 Graham Curtis Lampson, 2nd Baron Killearn (1919–1996). He died leaving daughters only, the youngest Hon. Nadine Marisa Lampson being married to Sir Nicholas Bonsor, Bt.
 Hon. Mary Lampson
 Hon. Margaret Lampson

After Rachel's death in 1930 he married secondly Jacqueline Aldine Leslie Castellani (1910–2015), daughter of Aldo Castellani,  (Hon.), in 1934. They had one son and two daughters:
 Victor Miles George Aldous Lampson, 3rd Baron Killearn. He has issue, including a son and heir apparent.
 Hon. Jacquetta Jean Frederica Lampson; she married Peregrine Eliot, 10th Earl of St Germans, and had issue, three sons.
 Hon. Roxana Rose Catherine Naila Lampson. She married Ian Ross, mother of six children, including the musicians Atticus Ross, Leopold Ross and the model Liberty Ross.

Lampson was a close personal friend of Sir Edward Peel.

Succession 

Lord Killearn died in September 1964, aged 84, and was succeeded in the barony by his son by his first marriage, Graham. As Graham died without male heirs, the title subsequently passed to Lord Killearn's son from his second marriage, Victor.

The 3rd Lord Killearn took legal action in 2011 to prevent his mother selling off the family home, Haremere Hall.

Arms

See also 

 List of colonial heads of Egypt
 Military history of Egypt during World War II

References

Sources
 The Killearn Diaries, 1934–1946, London: Sidwick and Jackson, 1972.
 Yapp, M.E. (ed.): Politics and diplomacy in Egypt: The diaries of Sir Miles Lampson, 1935–1937, Oxford: Published for the British Academy by Oxford University Press, 1997.
 Lord Killearn's Diaries: Custodial history: In the possession of Lord Killearn, the Lampson family, Drs Trefor Evans and David Steeds of the University of Aberystwyth. Reference code: GB165-0176. Dates of creation: 1926–1951. 8 boxes 25 volumes. Scope and content: 25 MS and TS volumes of diaries, 1926–51, covering his service in China, Egypt and the Sudan, and South-East Asia.
 Cassandra Jardine: "Grande dame is still giving high society plenty of cause for gossip", in: The Independent, Sunday 27 January 2008. Describes the life and times of the Dowager Lady Killearn (née Jacquetta Aldine Leslie Castellani).
 O'Sullivan, Christopher D.: FDR and the End of Empire: The Origins of American Power in the Middle East., Palgrave Macmillan, 2012.

External links 

 

1880 births
1964 deaths
Ambassadors of the United Kingdom to China
Ambassadors of the United Kingdom to Egypt
High Commissioners of the United Kingdom to Egypt
Companions of the Order of the Bath
Diplomatic peers
Knights Grand Cross of the Order of St Michael and St George
Members of the Royal Victorian Order
Members of the Privy Council of the United Kingdom
People educated at Eton College
Recipients of the Order of the Rising Sun, 3rd class
Recipients of the Order of the Sacred Treasure
Barons created by George VI